The NCAA Division II Women's Golf Championship, played in May, is the annual competition in women's collegiate golf for individuals and teams from universities in Division II. It is a stroke play team competition with an individual award as well.

A combined Division II and Division III championship was held from 1996 to 1999, splitting into separate championships starting in 2000.

In 2019, the format changed from four rounds of stroke play to three rounds of stroke play followed by an eight-team medal match play single-elimination tournament.

Results

Divisions II and III combined (1996–1999)

Division II only (2000–present)

Multiple winners

Team
The following schools have won more than one team championship:
6: Rollins
4: Florida Southern, Nova Southeastern
3: Methodist, Lynn
2: Indianapolis

Individual champion
The following women have won more than one individual championship:
2: Charlotte Campbell, Lisa Cave, Shanna Nagy, Jana Peterkova

Individual champion's school
The following schools have produced more than one individual champion:
6 champions: Florida Southern
4 champions: Rollins
3 champions: Nova Southeastern, Lynn
2 champions: Grand Valley State, Indianapolis

See also
AIAW Intercollegiate Women's Golf Champions
NAIA Women's Golf Championship
National Golf Coaches Association

References

External links
NCAA Division II women's golf

Golf, Women's
College golf in the United States
Team golf tournaments
Amateur golf tournaments in the United States
Women's golf tournaments in the United States